Michele Roberts may refer to:

Michele A. Roberts, American attorney and executive director of the National Basketball Players Association
Michèle Roberts (born 1949), British writer, novelist and poet